Liu Jing (born 7 December 1963) is a Chinese actor.

He has won the 25th China Golden Eagle Award for Favorite Actor and 5th China Golden Eagle Award for the Most Popular Actor.

Biography
Liu was born in Ngawa Tibetan and Qiang Autonomous Prefecture, Sichuan on December 7, 1963.

After graduating from People's Liberation Army Arts College he became an actor.

Works

Television

Film

Awards
 25th China Golden Eagle Award for Favorite Actor
 5th China Golden Eagle Award for the Most Popular Actor

References

1963 births
People from Ngawa
People's Liberation Army Arts College alumni
Male actors from Sichuan
Living people
Chinese male film actors
Chinese male television actors